Robert Van Den Neucker (born 20 July 1907, date of death unknown) was a Belgian Olympic fencer. He competed in the individual and team sabre events at the 1936 Summer Olympics.

References

1907 births
Year of death missing
Belgian male fencers
Belgian sabre fencers
Olympic fencers of Belgium
Fencers at the 1936 Summer Olympics